Laurinburg Commercial Historic District is a national historic district located in Laurinburg, North Carolina. The district encompasses 51 contributing buildings and 2 contributing structures in the central business district of Laurinburg.

History 
Structures in the historic district were built between about 1893 and 1953 and include notable examples of Streamline Moderne and Art Deco architecture. Notable buildings include the Central Hotel (c. 1893), McDougald's Furniture Store and Funeral Parlor (c. 1904), Everington's Drug Store (c. 1904), Scotland Pharmacy (1935), U.S. Post Office (1939) designed by the Office of the Supervising Architect under Louis A. Simon and built by the Federal Works Administration, First United Methodist Church (1918), Hammond Company Building, and (former) Winn Dixie Grocery Store (1953).

It was added to the National Register of Historic Places in 2003.

References

Historic districts on the National Register of Historic Places in North Carolina
Streamline Moderne architecture in the United States
Art Deco architecture in North Carolina
Buildings and structures in Scotland County, North Carolina
National Register of Historic Places in Scotland County, North Carolina